Qazi Hameeduddin  (1873–1940) was a manager in the Department of Tanzimat at Bhopal state during the period of Nawab Sultan Jahan Begum.

Biography
Qazi Hameeduddin was originally from Tijara and born on 16 Sha'aban1290 AH / 1873 AD. He was master in Arabic and Mathematics and was employed as 'Mansarim' (Manager) at the Department of 'Tanzimat' (a section in law). He got the pension in 1919 and returned to Tijara in 1921 to look after the work of Qaza. He bequeathed the work of Qaza to his son Qazi Amaduddin (died 29 October 1974 at Lahore) and came back to Bhopal

Hajj
He went to Hajj along with the delegation of Kaikhusrau Jahan, Begum of Bhopal.

Family history
Qazi Najibuddin son of Qazi Mohammad Ata was a man of eminence, rich in society and as a leader, he helped many relatives to get important positions at Nagpur. In his lifetime, he bequeathed his role as qazi to his elder son, Qazi Ghulam Mohiuddin and went himself to join the services in the court of Maharaja Nagpur. He joined army as Risaldar. He left the post of Risaldar for his another son, Mohammad Rahimuddin. He also helped to adjust his nephew Mohammad Aminuddin ibn Fasihuddin at various important posts.  Qazi Najibuddin was entitled with ‘'Khan Sahib" by Maharaja Nagpur. A paper where details of expenditure by Khan Sahib Mohammad Najibuddin Gharra dated Sifar 1222 AH (1807 AD), is extant in the library of Ibn Sina Academy of Medieval Medicine and Sciences. In Tijara, he planted a 20 Bigha garden for his son Qazi Ghulam Mohiuddin and another garden at 12 Bigha land for Mohammad Rahimuddin. Mohammad Rahimuddin remained as Risaldar 12 more years after the death of his father. In 1262 AH / 1845 AD, he returned to Tijara after dispute within the army. Later in his life from 1262 AH / 1845 AD to 1264 AH / 1847 AD, Mohammad Rahimuddin remained as Risaldar in the 15 Regiment of India. While he was on leave for 7 months in Tijara, he died on 14 Dhu al-Hijjah 1264 AH (Sunday) after getting short illness.

Qazi Ghulam Mohiuddin was born on 2 Rajab 1224 AH / 1809 AD. He became qazi after his father left this post for him. He remained qazi for 23 years. After the death of his brother Mohammad Rahimuddin, he attracted towards Spahigiri and joined 5th regiment of Punjab where he remained as Naib Risaldar for 10 years. He was very loyal and honest person. After suffering from fever for 2 and half months, he died at the age of 51 on 21 Rabi' al-thani at Thursday 1274 AH / 1857 AD near Roadi, District Dera Ismail Khan. He was taken care of by his maternal nephew Waliuddin (son of Ziauddin ibn Qazi Hisamuddin).

Qazi Ghulam Mohiuddin was first married to Fasihun Nisan (daughter of Mian Ghulam Ahmad ibn Mohammad Ahsan of Loni and had five daughters. He then married to Habibun Nisan (daughter of Afzal Hussain ibn Nijabat Hussain of Rewari). From Habibun Nisan, Qazi Fayyazuddin was born in 1847. The descendants of these 5 daughters and one son are in hundreds now, settled in India and Pakistan. One of the daughters, Amarun Nisan was married to Ghulam Mansoor. 
Qazi Fayyazuddin had five sons and 2 daughters.
The elder daughter Ruqqaiya Begum was married to Mufti Mohammad Siddiq and had 2 daughters while the younger daughter Ummatul Hafeez was married to Mahmoodul Haq ibn Afzalul Haq ibn Munshi Barkat Ali ibn Khairat Ali of Palwal and had no children. With second wife, Mahmoodul Haq had two sons namely Maulana Abrarul Haq (caliph of Ashraf Ali Thanwi) and Professor Anwarul Haq. They were all scholars of their times. Earliest books, 'Miratul Haqaiq' and 'Kitab Rahnuma-i Hujjaj' in their family extant even today was written by Munshi Barkat Ali. Khairat Ali and Hayat Ali were two prominent brothers settled in Palwal and sons of Mohammad Hasan Ali bin Kamaluddin. Khairat Ali was Sarrishtedar Deputy Commissioner of Gurgaon, who later on joined the services at the court of Maharaja Tijara. He died in Tijara but his body was taken to Delhi to bury near the grave of Shaikh Abdul Haq Mohaddis. Hayat Ali was Thanedar at Shahdara (Delhi).
The elder son was Qazi Hameeduddin, while other sons were Qazi Khaliluddin, Qazi Faizuddin and Qazi Ruknuddin. The younger son was Dr. Qazi Jamaluddin Jalai (married to Hashimi Begum, daughter of Mukhtar Jahan and Liaqat Hussain). Mukhtar Jahan was the daughter of Ghulam Ahmad Faroghi.

Marriage and children
From the first wife, Qazi Hameeduddin had two sons Qazi Amaduddin and Raziuddin. Qazi Amaduddin was the last Qazi of Tijara as he performed this job till 1947. In 1947, both these brothers were migrated to Pakistan. After the partition, Qazi Amaduddin was settled in Lahore while Raziuddin Qazi preferred to live in Karachi.

Qazi Amaduddin, from his third wife, had three sons. Late Prof. Qazi Salahuddin, Misbah Uddin Qazi and Shuja Uddin Qazi.

His son Misbah Uddin Qazi, who is also a renowned world famed artist, was married to elder daughter of Raziuddin Qazi. Their elder son is Sabah Uddin Qazi whereas Isbah Uddin Qazi is the elder grandson. Three generations used to live happily under a roof in Rawalpindi.

From the second wife, Aisha, Qazi Hameeduddin had one daughter, Sajida Begum. Aisha's father Haji Mahmood belonged to Kabul from where he went to Hajj and settled there at Makkah. In Makkah, he married Aisha' mother Nafeesa. Apart from Aisha, his other daughter's name was Zainab. Zainab was also married in Bhopal to Maulvi Abdullah who received Mansab from the Bhopal state. Aisha died two years after marriage.

After the death of Aisha, Qazi Hameeduddin married to her niece, Tahira. From Tahira, he had three sons Samsamuddin, Haji Israruddin and Dr. Anwaruddin. 
 Samsamuddin was not married.
 Haji Israruddin had one son, Ainuddin (married to Naheed, daughter of Akhtar Afzal ibn Misbahul Usman ibn Syed Afzal Ali). Mohammad Ainuddin has three sons, Mohammad Saad uddin ( director in big group ), Mohammad Zainuddin ( owner of a 50 bedded hospital ) has 2 son Mohammed Eiqanuddin and Mohammed Eizanuddin and Ameed uddin (working as manager in medical college )and a daughter named Bushra married with Muhi uddin in jhansi
 Dr. Anwaruddin had three sons – Rafiuddin, Rizwanuddin and Ruknuddin.

Death
When he came back to Bhopal from Tijara, he stayed with his son Israruddin and died in 1940.

See also 
Ghulam Mansoor
Munshi Hakimuddin (relative)

References 

People from Tijara
1940 deaths
Politicians from Bhopal
1873 births